Frank Sylvester "Silver" Flint (August 3, 1855 – January 14, 1892) was a catcher in Major League Baseball. He played 13 seasons of major league baseball for the St. Louis Red Stockings, Indianapolis Blues and Chicago White Stockings.

Biography
Flint began his career at age 19 with the St. Louis Red Stockings of the National Association, and he played one year for the Indianapolis Blues before joining the Chicago White Stockings in 1879, where he would remain for the rest of his playing career, eleven seasons almost exclusively as a catcher.

In his first season with the White Stockings, Flint and Cap Anson split duties piloting the team, which finished 5–12 under Flint and 41–21 under Anson. That was Flint's only opportunity as field manager.

Flint married Eva de la Motta, the ex-wife of minstrel show performer Lew Benedict, in 1879. Flint died in Chicago of tuberculosis in 1892.

See also
List of Major League Baseball player–managers

References

External links

1855 births
1892 deaths
19th-century baseball players
Major League Baseball catchers
Major League Baseball player-managers
St. Louis Red Stockings players
Indianapolis Blues players
Chicago White Stockings players
Chicago White Stockings (original) managers
Indianapolis Blues (minor league) players
Springfield (minor league baseball) players
Baseball players from Philadelphia
19th-century deaths from tuberculosis
Tuberculosis deaths in Illinois